Lai Yiu Cheong (born 25 September 1988 in Hong Kong) is a former Hong Kong professional football player who currently plays as a winger for Hong Kong First Division League club Icanfield.

Club career

Rangers
Lai Yiu Cheong made his Hong Kong First Division debut in the 2006–07 season. On 29 September 2006, Lai Yiu Cheong earned a place in the match squad list in the match against HKFC, but was an unused substitute player. Then, he finally made his first division league debut on 18 November 2006, in a match against Tai Po, being substituted 3 minutes before the end of the match. He finally had three league appearances and played one match in Hong Kong Senior Challenge Shield and Hong Kong FA Cup, respectively.

In the 2007–08 season, Lai Yiu Cheong got a lot more chances. He made 8 league appearances, although he was only a usual substitute in the team. For cup games, he played 3 Hong Kong League Cup games and 1 Hong Kong FA Cup match. However, he could not help the team to stay in the First Division.

Fourway
After spending 2 seasons in Rangers, he followed former Rangers club director Lee Fai Lap and joined the newly formed club Fourway in the beginning of the 2008–09 season. He scored his first first division league goal in the match against Tuen Mun Progoal on 31 October 2008. He made 9 league appearances and played 3 Hong Kong Senior Challenge Shield matches. He then eventually left the club in January 2009.

Pegasus
Lai Yiu Cheong joined Pegasus in January 2009. He was given the kit number 26. He had been an important player since his transfer to the club. He made 11 league appearances and scored 2 goals in his first season in Pegasus.

In the 2009–10 season, Lai Yiu Cheong made a total of 18 appearances, including 14 league games, 2 Senior Shield games and 2 FA Cup games. He scored only one goal for the team in the season, which was the winning goal for the team against Tai Po on 20 February 2010. He helped the team to win a place for the 2011 AFC Cup group stage.

In the 2010–11 season he played many matches for the team. He played 14 league games and scored 1 league goal. The goal was scored in the home game against South China on 22 April 2011. However, the goal did not help the team to win the game, being defeated 2—3. He featured all 6 AFC Cup group stage matches for the team and scored 2 goals. However, the team did not qualify to the knock-out stage.

Tuen Mun
On 13 June 2012, Lai Yiu Cheong joined Tuen Mun.

Sun Hei
On 1 January 2014, Rangers director Philip Lee announced that Lai would join Sun Hei on loan after being released by Tuen Mun.

Lee Man
On 3 July 2017, Lai moved to Lee Man. He signed with the club following Lee & Man Paper's decision to withdraw their sponsorship with Rangers and form their own HKPL club.

On 24 January 2018, Yuen Long acquired Lai on loan for the remainder of the 2017–18 season. He scored one goal in two appearances during his loan spell.

Lai left the club after the end of the 2018–19 season.

Honours

Club
Lee Man
 Hong Kong Sapling Cup: 2018–19

International
Hong Kong
East Asian Games: 2009

Career statistics

Club

International

Hong Kong
As of 7 January 2011

Hong Kong U-23
As of 4 December 2010

Personal life
On 29 May 2018, Lai married his girlfriend of ten years, Yuki.

References

External links

Hong Kong footballers
Hong Kong First Division League players
Hong Kong Premier League players
Fourway Athletics players
TSW Pegasus FC players
1988 births
Living people
Hong Kong international footballers
Hong Kong Rangers FC players
Tuen Mun SA players
South China AA players
Sun Hei SC players
Lee Man FC players
Yuen Long FC players
Footballers at the 2010 Asian Games
Association football wingers
Asian Games competitors for Hong Kong